Sleaford is a market town and civil parish in the North Kesteven district of Lincolnshire, England. Centred on the former parish of New Sleaford, the modern boundaries and urban area include Quarrington to the south-west, Holdingham to the north and Old Sleaford to the east. Its population of 17,671 at the 2011 Census made it the largest settlement in the North Kesteven district; it is the district's administrative centre. Bypassed by the A17 and the A15, it is linked to Lincoln, Newark, Peterborough, Grantham and King's Lynn.

The first settlement formed in the Iron Age where a prehistoric track crossed the River Slea. It was a tribal centre and home to a mint for the Corieltauvi in the 1st centuries BC and AD. Evidence of Roman and Anglo-Saxon settlement has been found. The medieval records differentiate between Old and New Sleaford, the latter emerging by the 12th century around the present-day market place and St Denys' Church; Sleaford Castle was also built at that time for the Bishops of Lincoln, who owned the manor. Granted the right to hold a market in the mid-12th century, New Sleaford developed into a market town and became locally important in the wool trade, while Old Sleaford declined.

From the 16th century, the landowning Carre family kept tight control over the town – it grew little in the early modern period. The manor passed from the Carre family to the Hervey family by the marriage of Isabella Carre to John Hervey, 1st Earl of Bristol in 1688. The town's common land and fields were legally enclosed by 1794, giving ownership mostly to the Hervey family. This coincided with canalisation of the Slea. The Sleaford Navigation brought economic growth until it was superseded by the railways in the mid-1850s. In the 20th century, the sale of farmland around Sleaford led to the development of large housing estates.

Sleaford was mainly an agricultural town until the 20th century with a cattle market. Seed companies such as Hubbard and Phillips and Sharpes International were established in the late 19th century. The arrival of the railway made the town favourable for malting, but the industry has since declined. In 2011, the commonest occupations were in wholesale and retail trading, health and social care, public administration, defence and manufacturing. Regeneration of the town centre has helped to regenerate the earlier industrial areas, including construction of the National Centre for Craft & Design (The Hub) on an old wharf.

History

Etymology
The earliest records of the place-name Sleaford are found in a charter of 852 as Slioford and in the Anglo-Saxon Chronicle as Sliowaford. In the Domesday Book (1086), it is recorded as Eslaforde and in the early 13th century as Sliforde. In the 13th century Book of Fees it appears as Lafford.

Early period

Archaeological material from the Bronze Age and earlier has been recovered and excavations have shown there was unsustained late-Neolithic and Bronze Age human activity in the vicinity. The earliest known permanent settlement dates from the Iron Age, where a track northwards from Bourne crossed the River Slea. Although only sparse pottery evidence has been found for the middle Iron Age period, 4,290 pellet mould fragments, probably used for minting and dated to 50 BC–AD 50, have been uncovered south-east of the modern town centre, south of a crossing of the River Slea and near Mareham Lane in Old Sleaford. The largest of its kind in Europe, the deposit has led archaeologists to consider that the site in Old Sleaford as one of the largest Corieltauvian settlements in the period and possibly a tribal centre.

During the Roman occupation of Britain (AD 43–409), the settlement was "extensive and of considerable importance". Its location beside the Fens may have made it economically and administratively significant as a centre for stewards and owners of fenland estates. When the first roads were built by the Romans, Sleaford was bypassed as "less conveniently located" and more "geared to native needs". A smaller road, Mareham Lane, which the Romans renewed, ran through Old Sleaford, and south along the fen edge towards Bourne. Where it passed through Old Sleaford, excavations have shown a large stone-built domestic residence, associated farm buildings, corn-driers, ovens and field systems, all from the Roman period, and a number of burials. Other Roman remains, including a burial, have been excavated in the town.

Middle Ages

There is little evidence of continuous settlement between the late Roman and Anglo-Saxon periods but the Saxons did establish themselves eventually. South of the modern town, a 6th to 7th-century cemetery has been uncovered with an estimated 600 burials, many showing signs of pagan burial rites. The now ruined Church of St Giles/All Saints at Old Sleaford has been discovered and excavations of the market place in 1979 uncovered Anglo-Saxon remains from the 8th–9th centuries, indicating some form of enclosure with domestic features.

The earliest documentary reference to Sleaford occurs in a 9th-century charter, when it was owned by Medehamstede Abbey in Peterborough, a Mercian royal foundation. There is little evidence of estate structure until the late Saxon period, but there may have been a market and court before the Norman Conquest, and it may well have been an economic and jurisdictional centre for surrounding settlements. The Slea played a big part in the town's economy: it never ran dry or froze, and by the 11th century it supported a dozen watermills. The mills and others in nearby Quarrington and the lost hamlet of Millsthorpe, formed the "most important mill cluster in Lincolnshire".

In the later Middle Ages, the Romano-British settlement became known as Old Sleaford, while New Sleaford was a settlement centred on St Denys' Church and the market place. The Domesday Book of 1086 has two entries under Eslaforde (Sleaford) recording land held by Ramsey Abbey and the Bishop of Lincoln. The location of the manors recorded in Domesday is unclear. One theory endorsed by Maurice Beresford is that they focused on the settlement at Old Sleaford, due to evidence that New Sleaford was planted in the 12th century by the bishop to increase his income, a development associated with the construction of Sleaford Castle between 1123 and 1139. Beresford's theory has been criticised by the local historians Christine Mahany and David Roffe who have reinterpreted the Domesday material and argued that in 1086 the Bishop's manor included the church and associated settlement which became "New" Sleaford.

A charter to hold a fair on the feast day of St Denis was granted by King Stephen to Alexander, Bishop of Lincoln, in 1136–1140. Between 1154 and 1165, Henry II granted the bishop of Lincoln the right to hold a market at Sleaford; Bishop Oliver Sutton argued in 1281 that his right to hold a market and fair had existed since time immemorial. In 1329, Edward III confirmed the market. In 1401, Henry IV granted the bishop fairs on the feast days of St Denis and St Peter's Chains. A survey of 1258 is the first to mention burgage tenure; tenants in the nearby hamlet of Holdingham held tofts with other land, while those in New Sleaford held only tofts, indicating that demesne farming centred on the hamlet. The town later had at least two guilds comparable to those found in developed towns. However, there was no formal charter outlining its freedoms; it was not a centre of trade, and tight control by the bishops meant the economy was mainly geared to serve them. So it retained a strong tradition of demesne farming well into the 14th century. As the economic initiative passed more to burgesses and middlemen who formed ties with nearby towns such as Boston, evidence suggests that Sleaford developed a locally important role in the wool trade. In the Lay Subsidy of 1334, New Sleaford was the wealthiest settlement in the Flaxwell wapentake, with a value of £16 0s. 8d.1/4d. Meanwhile, Old Sleaford, an "insignificant" place since the end of the Roman period, declined and may have been deserted by the 16th century.

Early modern period

The manor of Old Sleaford was owned in the late 15th and early 16th centuries by the Hussey family, but John Hussey, 1st Baron Hussey of Sleaford was executed for treason for his part in the Lincolnshire Rising. The manor and his residence at Old Place reverted to the Crown and were later sold to Robert Carre. George Carre or Carr from Northumberland had settled in Sleaford by 1522 when he was described as a wool merchant. His son Robert bought Hussey's land and the castle and manor of New Sleaford from Edward Clinton, 1st Earl of Lincoln. His eldest surviving son Robert, founded Carre's Grammar School in 1604, and his youngest son Edward was created a baronet; his son founded Sleaford Hospital in 1636. The last male descendant died in 1683 and the heiress, Isabella Carre, married John Hervey, Earl of Bristol, in whose family the estates remained until the 1970s. The Carres and Herveys had a strong influence: while extracting dues from their tenants, they took leading tradesmen to the Exchequer Court to gain legal force behind their monopoly on charging tolls on market and cattle traders and for driving animals through the town.

Industry was slow to take hold. By the second half of the 18th century, Cogglesford Mill was the only working corn mill in the town. An old mill at the junction of Westgate and Castle Causeway supplied hemp to the growing rope-making business of the Foster and Hill families. As local historian Simon Pawley wrote, "In many respects, things had changed little [by 1783] since the survey of 1692," with few of the buildings or infrastructure being improved. Major changes to agriculture and industry took place in the last decade of that century. From the Middle Ages, Sleaford was surrounded by three open fields known as North, West and Sleaford Fields. Despite the costs of fencing and re-organisation, the system was easier to farm and cottages were built closer to fields, while the landowner could charge more rent owing to the increased profitability of the land; those who lost out were the cottagers, who could no longer keep a few animals grazing on the common land at no cost. The process allowed the land boundaries and pathways to be tidied; Drove Lane, running to Rauceby, was shifted north and straightened.

Industrial development

Canalisation of the River Slea began in the 1790s. Canals in England were constructed from the 1760s to make inland trade easier; Sleaford's businessmen were keen to benefit from these. Sleaford Navigation opened in 1794. It eased the export of farm produce to the Midlands and the import of coal and oil. Mills along the Slea benefited and wharves were constructed around Carre Street. Between 1829 and 1836 the navigation's toll rights increased in value 27 times over. The railways emerged in the 19th century as an alternative to canals and arrived at the town in 1857, when a line from Grantham to Sleaford opened. This made trading easier and improved communications, but led to the decline of the Navigation Company. Income from tolls decreased by 80 per cent between 1858 and 1868; it made its first loss in 1873 and was abandoned in 1878. The town's rural location and transport links led in the late 19th century to the rise of two local seed merchants: Hubbard and Phillips, and Charles Sharpe; the former took over the Navigation Wharves, and the latter was trading in the US and Europe by the 1880s. The railway, Sleaford's rural location and its artesian wells, were key factors in the development of the  Bass & Co maltings complex at Mareham Lane (1892–1905).

Sleaford's population more than doubled from 1,596 in 1801 to 3,539 in 1851. Coinciding with this is the construction or extension of public buildings, often by the local contractors Charles Kirk and Thomas Parry. The gasworks opened in 1839 to provide lighting in the town. Sleaford's Poor Law Union was formed in 1836 to cater for the town and the surrounding 54 parishes. A workhouse was built by 1838, able to house 181 inmates. Despite these advances, the slums around Westgate were crowded, lacking in sanitation and ridden by disease; the local administration failed to deal with the matter until 1850, when a report on the town's public health by the General Board of Health heavily criticised the situation and set up a Local Board of Health to undertake public works. By the 1880s, Lord Bristol had allowed clean water to be pumped into the town, but engineering problems and a reluctance to sell land to house the turbines had delayed the introduction of sewers.

Post-industrial period

Although hardly damaged in the First and Second World Wars, Sleaford has close links with the Royal Air Force due to proximity to several RAF bases, including RAF Cranwell and RAF Waddington. Lincolnshire's topography – flat and open countryside – and its location in the east of the country made it ideal for the airfields being constructed in the First World War. Work began on Cranwell in late 1915; it was designated an RAF base in 1918 and the RAF College opened in 1920 as the world's first air academy. A Cranwell branch railway linking Sleaford station with the RAF base opened in 1917 and closed in 1956. During the Second World War, Lincolnshire was "the most significant location for bomber command" and Rauceby Hospital, south-west of Sleaford, was requisitioned by the RAF as a specialist burns unit which the plastic surgeon Archibald McIndoe regularly visited.

Sleaford's population remained static between the wars, but the Great Depression in the 1930s caused unemployment to rise. The Council housing put up along Drove Lane proved insufficient for the low-income families after the Westgate slums were cleared in the 1930s; Jubilee Grove opened in that decade to meet the demand.

In the post-war period, there were housing developments at St Giles Avenue, the Hoplands, Russell Crescent, Jubilee Grove and Grantham Road. Parts of the town were redeveloped: in 1958, the Bristol Arms Arcade opened, the Corn Exchange was demolished in the 1960s and the Waterside Shopping Precinct opened in 1973, as did Flaxwell House, designed to house a department store, though later becoming the national headquarters for Interflora.

By 1979, the major landowner, Victor Hervey, 6th Marquess of Bristol, was heavily in debt and sold most of his estates in Sleaford and Quarrington. The estate office closed in 1989. Much of the land went to property developers and subsequent decades brought new housing and a considerable rise in population. According to a council report, people were attracted to the town by "the quality of life, low crime rates, relatively low house prices and good-quality education". From 1981 to 2011, Sleaford's population rose from 8,000 to 18,000; the growth rate in 1991–2001 was the fastest of any town in the county. The infrastructure struggled to cope, especially with increased traffic congestion. Two bypasses opened and a one-way system was introduced, a process that Simon Pawley argues accelerated the decline of the High Street. In the early 2000s, the Single Regeneration Budget of £15 million granted to Sleaford improved the town centre and funded development of the Hub (from 2011 to 2021, the National Centre for Craft & Design) in the old Navigation wharves area.

Geography

Topography
Sleaford is the principal market town in the North Kesteven district of Lincolnshire. The civil parish includes the hamlet of Holdingham to the north east and the village of Quarrington to the south east, both of which merge with the town. Sleaford lies some 43 feet (13 m) above sea level close to Lincoln Cliff, a Limestone scarp running north–south through Lindsey and Kesteven. The bedrock under the western half of the town belongs to the Great Oolite Group of Jurassic Sandstone, Limestone and Argillaceous rocks formed 168−165 million years ago; Kellaways and Oxford Clay formations, dated to 165–156 million years ago, underlie the eastern half. Alluvium deposits are found along the Slea's course, and Fen sand and gravel are found to the east and south.

The town is on the edge of the Fens, a low-lying region of the East of England which, before drainage from the 17th to the 20th centuries, were marshy and liable to flooding. Draining has revealed nutrient-rich soils and allowed 88 per cent of the land to be cultivated, mainly as arable. Most of it qualifies amongst the most productive farmland in the country. Two Local Nature Reserves sit within the civil parish boundaries: Lollycocks Field, providing mostly wildflower and wetlands habitats alongside Eastgate, and Mareham Pastures, consisting of wildflower meadows, new woodland, hedges and open grassland.

Climate
Lincolnshire's position in the east of Britain brings a sunnier, warmer climate than average. It is one of the driest counties. Although it may vary depending on altitude and proximity to the coast, the mean average temperature for the East of England is approximately 9 °C to 10.5 °C; the highest temperature recorded in the region was 37.3 °C at Cavendish on 10 August 2003. On average, the region experiences 30 days of rainfall in winter and 25 in summer, with 15 days of thunder and 6–8 days of hail per year; on 25 August 2001, hail the size of golf balls were reported in Sleaford and other parts of central Lincolnshire. Wind tends to affect the north and west of the country more than the East, and Lincolnshire tends to get no more than two days of gale per year (where gale is a gust of wind at >34 knots, sustained for at least 10 minutes). Despite this, tornadoes form more often in the East of England than elsewhere; Sleaford suffered them in 2006 and 2012, both causing damage to property.

Governance

Politics

Before 1832, Sleaford was in the Lincolnshire parliamentary constituency, which encompassed all of the county except for four boroughs. In the 1818 election, 49 of the 2,000 people living in New and Old Sleaford and Quarrington qualified to vote. In 1832, the Reform Act widened the franchise and divided Lincolnshire. Sleaford was in the South Lincolnshire constituency that elected two members to Parliament. Following the 1867 reforms, the South Lincolnshire constituency's borders were redrawn, but Sleaford remained within it. The franchise was widened by the reforms so that roughly 15% (202) of males in Sleaford and Quarrington could vote in 1868. The constituency was abolished in 1885 and the Sleaford constituency formed. It merged with the Grantham seat in 1918. In 1997, Sleaford was reorganised into Sleaford and North Hykeham.

From 1999 until 2020, Lincolnshire elected members of the European Parliament as part of the East Midlands constituency.

Local government

From the early medieval period, New Sleaford was in the Flaxwell wapentake and Old Sleaford in the Ashwardhurn one. Sleaford Poor Law Union, overseen by a Board of Guardians, was founded in 1836. A Local Board of Health was formed in 1851. After the Public Health Act 1872 established Urban and Rural Sanitary Districts (USD or RSD), Sleaford USD incorporated New and Old Sleaford, Holdingham and Quarrington, while the Sleaford RSD included all other parishes in the Poor Law Union. The Local Government Act 1894 converted the Board of Health and USD into the Sleaford Urban District Council; in 1899, the town became the administrative base of Kesteven County Council. In 1973, Sleaford Urban District merged with the North and East Kesteven Rural Districts to form North Kesteven, a district of Lincolnshire; by statutory instrument, Sleaford civil parish became the urban district's successor, thus merging Quarrington, New Sleaford, Old Sleaford and Holdingham civil parishes.

Sleaford Town Council, the parish-level local government body beneath the district council, consists of 18 councillors from six wards: Castle, Holdingham, Mareham, Navigation, Quarrington and Westholme. The Chairman of the Town Council is also the Mayor of Sleaford. The six wards are also represented on North Kesteven District Council, although Mareham and Quarrington are merged into a single ward. Sleaford sends one councillor to Lincolnshire County Council. Sleaford Town Council has offices on Carre Street and the District Council offices are in the Lafford Terrace building on Eastgate, which was purchased by the council in 1934.

Sleaford Urban District Council was granted a coat of arms on 26 October 1950 and after it was abolished the arms were used by its successor, Sleaford Town Council. The arms are blazoned: Gules on a Chevron Or three Estoiles Sable on a Chief Argent as many Trefoils slipped Vert. The trefoils in the chief are from the arms of the Marquess or Bristol, while the lower portion of the shield is the arms of the Carre family. Its crest is blazoned: On a Wreath of the Colours an Eagle wings extended and head downwards and to the sinister proper holding in the beak an Ear of Wheat stalked and leaved Or, the eagle symbolises Sleaford's links with the Royal Air Force and the ear of wheat represents agriculture.

Public services
Policing is provided by the Lincolnshire Police, fire-fighting by the Lincolnshire Fire and Rescue Service and ambulance services by the East Midlands Ambulance Service. The police station is on Boston Road, although older premises on Kesteven Street were erected in 1845 and reconstructed in 1912. The fire and ambulance services share accommodation on Eastgate which opened in 2018; the fire station had previously been on Church Lane and the ambulance service had operated from Kesteven Street. The United Lincolnshire Hospitals NHS Trust provides services at three hospitals, Pilgrim Hospital in Boston, Grantham and District Hospital, and Lincoln County Hospital.

In 1879, an Act of Parliament was passed to set up a water company for the town; pumping machinery was installed and works constructed in 1880 to provide a clean water supply to the town. In 1948, the council took over the company and in 1962 its operation was handed to the Kesteven Water Board, which was absorbed by the Anglian Water Authority in 1973.

The County Council promoted a Bill to Parliament to build an electricity generating station which passed in 1900. It was built at the cost of £6,700 in 1901 on Castle Causeway and remained there until nationalisation in 1948. Following nationalisation, electricity was provided by the East Midlands Electricity Board until it was privatised in 1990. A "virtually carbon neutral" straw-burning power-station at Sleaford opened in 2013; capable of supplying electricity to 65,000 homes, it is powered by straw bales from farms within a  radius. Most electricity generated is fed into the National Grid and the facility provides free heat to public buildings in the town.

The Sleaford Gas Light Company was formed in 1838. The following year gas lighting was provided and a gasworks was constructed in Eastgate. In 1866, the company was incorporated; in 1895–96, the works were rebuilt and lit the town until the company was nationalised in 1948. Gas ceased to be made there in the 1960s and the original buildings were retained, although later extensions were demolished in 1966–1968.

Sleaford Library houses a local and family history section and microfiche machine. It was refurbished in 2010, but, as of 2014, was listed by the county council as "undersized".

Economy

Employment 
Sleaford served the surrounding agricultural communities and the town maintained a weekly market throughout the 19th century and a livestock market on Northgate from 1874 until 1984. According to a 2010 council report, the public sector was the town's main employer, along with agriculture and manufacturing. Unemployment was lower than the national average as were wages reflecting pay in the food processing and agricultural industries. At the 2011 Census, the largest group of working-age persons by economic activity are those in full-time employment, who make up 43.8 per cent of this section of the population, while 15 per cent are part-time employees and 7.7 per cent are self-employed; 15 per cent of the working-age population were retired, 4.2 per cent unemployed, with 40 per cent of those in long-term unemployment and roughly one third aged 16 to 24. The largest socio-economic grouping is those working in lower-tier managerial or administrative roles (21.9 per cent), followed by semi-routine (17.8 per cent), routine (15 per cent) and intermediate (12.5 per cent) occupations; no other group comprised 10 per cent or more. In terms of industry, the most common, based on those working in the sector, are the wholesale and retail trades (including automotive repairs) at 16.9 per cent, health and social care (13.4 per cent), public administration and defence (13.3 per cent) and manufacturing (10.9 per cent), with no other groups representing 10 per cent or more. An unemployment survey of Lincolnshire in 2014 found that the county experienced a decline in unemployment (based on Jobseekers Allowance claimants) by 29 per cent over the preceding 12 months, while the county's unemployment rate was marginally below the national average.

Regeneration
In 2011 North Kesteven District Council produced a 25-year strategy to regenerate the town, since its rapid growth since the 1990s had outgrown improvements to its infrastructure. It planned future residential developments and outlined ways to improve the town centre. It suggested developing more parking around the centre and reverting parts of the one-way system, developing southern Southgate and turning Money's Yard into an attraction to link with the National Centre for Craft and Design. North Kesteven District Council granted planning permission for a £56 m project to redevelop the derelict Bass Maltings site by converting it into residential and retail space and creating about 500 permanent jobs. The development including a supermarket was delayed when the town council opposed a link road through part of the recreation ground. Tesco, who had pledged to invest in a £20 million store in the development withdrew in January 2015 following financial set-backs.

Transport

The A17 road from Newark-on-Trent to King's Lynn bypasses Sleaford from Holdingham Roundabout to Kirkby la Thorpe. It ran through the town until the bypass opened in 1975. The Holdingham roundabout connects the A17 to the A15 road from Peterborough to Scawby. It also passed through Sleaford until 1993, when its bypass was completed. Three roads meet at Sleaford's market place: Northgate (B1518), Southgate and Eastgate (B1517). A one-way system set up in 1994 creates a circuit around the town centre.

The railways arrived in the 19th century. Early proposals to bring a line to Sleaford failed, but in 1852 plans were made to build the Boston, Sleaford and Midland Counties Railway and its Act of Parliament passed in 1853. The line from Grantham opened in 1857; Boston was connected in 1859, Bourne in 1871 and Ruskington on Great Northern and Great Eastern Joint Railway in 1882.

Sleaford is a stop on the Peterborough to Lincoln Line and the Poacher Line, from Grantham to Skegness. Trains from Grantham to London King's Cross take approximately 1 hour 15 minutes.

The River Slea through the town was converted into use as a canal for much of the 19th century. Plans to canalise it were drawn up in 1773, but faced opposition from land-owners who feared it might affect the drainage of fens. Plans were approved in 1791 with the support of Brownlow Bertie, 5th Duke of Ancaster and Kesteven who owned estates and quarries that he hoped would benefit. An Act of Parliament passed in 1792, establishing the Sleaford Navigation, which opened two years later. After falling revenues due to competition from the railways, the navigation company closed in 1878. The river, although no longer navigable, passes under Carre Street and Southgate. The Nine Foot Drain, also unnavigable, meets the Slea just before Southgate.

Demography

Ethnicity
The 2011 census gave an ethnicity count of:
93.57% White British 
4.04% White other
1.09% Asian or Asian British
0.26% Black or Black British
0.05% Arab
0.12% Other 
0.87% Mixed

The resident population at the 2011 Census was 17,671, which accounts for some 15 per cent of the population of the North Kesteven District; the urban area contained 8,690 houses. The town's population grew by 39% between 1991 and 2001, the fastest growth rate of any town in Lincolnshire. The district population is predicted to rise by 29 per cent between 2008 and 2033, compared with a national average of 18 per cent; in 2013, county councillors approved plans to build 4,500 new homes. A joint planning strategy report found that "This growth has largely been the result of people moving to the area attracted by the quality of life, low crime rates, relatively low house prices and good-quality education."

The 2011 Census revealed that approximately 93.6 per cent of the town's resident population were White British; the second largest ethnic group was White Irish at approximately 3.4 per cent, followed by Asian (including Asian British) at 1.09 per cent; no other ethnic group represented 1% or more of the population; 88.5 per cent of residents were born in England and 4.41 per cent in other parts of the United Kingdom; 4.3 per cent were from EU countries, with 2.5 per cent coming from EU member states which joined after 2001.

Between December 2013 and November 2014, 1,289 criminal acts were reported, of which 43.9 per cent were classed as anti-social behaviour, making it the largest portion of reported crimes. In 2010, recorded crime levels were amongst the lowest in the country and, for the year ending June 2014, the crime rate in the North Kesteven district is the lowest in Lincolnshire at 24.38 crimes per thousand residents.

Religion

Population
Most people in the town identify as Christian. At the 2011 Census, 70.3 per cent of residents identified as Christian, while 21.8 per cent reported no religion, and 6.6 per cent did not state a religion; no other religious group comprised 1 per cent or more of the population. The 2001 Census recorded that 81.6 per cent of Sleaford residents identified as Christian, nearly ten percentage points higher than the national figure (71.8 per cent); 11.5 per cent of the town's residents had no religion and 6 per cent did not disclose a religion.

In the Compton Census (1676), New Sleaford had a Conformist population of 576 people, no "Papists" and 6 Non-conformists. In the 19th century, it had a sizeable Non-conformist population and a large Anglican congregation; at the 1851 Census of Religious Worship, an estimated 2,000 people attended Non-conformist places of worship, while an estimated 600–700 people attended Anglican services in the parish. The Wesleyans met in Westgate in the early 19th century; by 1848, the congregation had set up in Northgate, an area known for its taverns and poor tenements.

Ecclesiastical history
New Sleaford had a church and priest by the time of the Domesday Book (1086) and the vicarage was founded in 1274. During the Commonwealth (1649–60), the vicar was expelled and replaced by Puritan ministers, the last of whom was removed following the Restoration in 1660 and replaced with an Anglican clergyman. In 1616, the vicarage was valued at £8 and in 1872 at £180. As of 2015, the ecclesiastical parish of St Denys, Sleaford, encloses the town of Sleaford and hamlet of Holdingham north of the railway line and does not include Quarrington. It falls within the Lafford Deanery, the Lincoln Archdeaconry and the Diocese of Lincoln. The patron is the Bishop of Lincoln and the incumbent vicar is the Rev. Philip Anthony Johnson, who was instituted in 2013.

Old Sleaford was in the possession of Ramsey Abbey at the time of Domesday and later Haverholme Priory, and was eventually served by a vicar; the church was dedicated either to St Giles or to All Saints. At the Dissolution of the Monasteries (1536–41), the king took over collection of the tithes, eventually leasing them to Thomas Horseman and then selling them to Robert Carre. In the 17th century, the rectory of Quarrington and the vicarage were combined to form the parish of Quarrington with Old Sleaford. The parish boundaries of New Sleaford and Quarrington with Old Sleaford were last altered in 1928.

The prebendary of New Sleaford or Lafford had a seat in the Lincoln Cathedral; it is not known when it was established, but it was confirmed by the Pope in 1146 and 1163, and was in the patronage of the bishop. Sleaford's tithes paid to the prebendary were valued at £11 19s. 7d. (£11.98) in 1616. After the enclosure of Sleaford's fields, a farm at Holdingham Anna was allotted to the prebendary in place of the tithes. The Prebendal Court of Sleaford had jurisdiction over New and Old Sleaford and Holdingham to grant administration and probate. The parishes of New and Old Sleaford were in the peculiar jurisdiction of the predendary until 1846, when they became part of Aswardhurn and Lafford Rural Deanery. In 1866 they were placed in Aswardhurn and Lafford No. 2 Rural Deanery, from 1884 in the Lafford No. 2 Rural Deanery, the Lafford South Rural Deanery from 1910, and since 1968, the Lafford Rural Deanery.

Places of worship

The Anglican parish church, St Denys, fronts onto the market place; the oldest parts date to the late-12th century and the broach-spire, built around 1220, is one of the oldest in England.

Non-conformist meetings took place on Hen Lane (later Jermyn Street) from about 1776. The Congregationalists who met there constructed a chapel on Southgate in 1867–1868 (extended in 2007); in 1972, it became Sleaford United Reformed Church, which merged with Sleaford Community Church to form Riverside Church in 2008. Wesleyans first met in the 1790s at the house of Thomas Fawcett on Westgate. They built a chapel nearby in 1802, which was replaced in 1823; it housed the congregation until 1848 when a larger one was built on North Street. It was demolished and replaced by another on the same site in 1972. A Baptist chapel was built in Old Sleaford in 1811 to house a congregation of 250, it served the Strict Baptists until possibly the mid-20th century. The premises have been converted into a house. A Wesleyan Reform Methodist chapel opened in West Banks in 1864, but since 1896 has been occupied by the Salvation Army.

The Fens were increasingly cultivated after the Napoleonic Wars, prompting migrant Catholic Irish farm-workers to move to the area. By 1879 a Roman Catholic missionary, Father Hermann Sabela, was conducting services in the town. A Catholic school and chapel were built in 1881 on land in Jermyn Street and in 1888, Our Lady of Good Counsel Roman Catholic Church, opened beside it. The incumbent priest is Father Michael John Bell, who was appointed in 2001. Mass is held on Sundays and throughout the week.

The Sleaford Muslim Community Association met in St Deny's Church Hall during the early 2000s. A prayer hall was opened in Station Road in 2015 which has a custom dome and small minarets on it. Protests were planned by the English Defence League, but were cancelled.

Sleaford Spiritualist Church opened in about 1956 on Westgate.

Education

Primary

Sleaford has four primary schools. In 1726 William Alvey bequeathed land to fund teaching children in Sleaford. The school and master's house for Alvey's Endowed School, a national school, was built in 1851. New buildings for the infants' school were constructed in 1888. William Alvey Church of England School is housed in the same buildings. It became an academy in 2012. St Botolph's School is a Church of England Primary School, which opened at its current site in 2002. Church Lane School is housed in buildings constructed in 2002, when the original school house was demolished; in 2013, it had  201 children on roll. Our Lady of Good Counsel Roman Catholic School had 155 pupils on roll in 2011.

In 1835, there were eight day schools and three Sunday schools in New Sleaford and two daily schools in Old Sleaford. An infant school in the old playhouse on Westgate opened in 1855; Wesleyan schools attached to the chapel on North Street accommodated up to 200 pupils. In addition to private girls' schools, short-lived private schools for boys were established by Mr Herring and Charles Boyer in 1851, Henry Carruthers, and Edwin Reginald Dibben in 1870 in competition with the grammar school. Charles Kirk built a school and chapel at Quarrington in 1867. It became St Botolph's Primary School and in 2002 moved to a new site. In 1879, an art school was established in Duke Street in connection with the Science and Art Department; by 1896, two Wesleyan schools and a Catholic school were also in operation.

Secondary

The town has three secondary schools with sixth forms: Carre's Grammar School, a boys' grammar school, Kesteven and Sleaford High School, a selective academy girls' grammar school, and St George's Academy, formerly St George's College of Technology, and before that Sleaford (County) Secondary Modern School (mixed non-selective secondary school). The grammar schools are selective and pupils are required to pass the Eleven plus exam. St George's is not selective. The co-educational Joint Sixth Form consortium allows pupils to choose subjects taught at all three schools.

Carre's Grammar School was founded in 1604 by a bequest of Robert Carre of Aswarby. It has received Specialist Sports and Science statuses, became an academy in 2011 and was judged to be "good" by Ofsted in 2013, at which time it had 817 pupils, including the co-educational sixth form. Sleaford and Kesteven High School for Girls was established in 1902. It has specialist art status, became an academy in 2011 and was judged to be "good" by Ofsted in 2013, at which time there were 825 pupils on roll, including those in the co-educational sixth form. St George's opened in 1908 as Sleaford Council School. It has received specialist technology college status, converted to an academy in 2010 and operates a satellite school at Ruskington. St George's had 2,247 pupils on roll in 2012, across both sites and including the sixth form; when assessed by Ofsted in that year, was judged to be "good".

Culture

The National Centre for Craft & Design opened as The Hub in 2003 with support from a Single Regeneration Budget grant. It attracts 90,000 visitors on average each year and houses exhibitions of applied and contemporary art. 
The Playhouse theatre on Westgate was constructed in 1825 for Joseph Smedley and sold in 1856 to be converted into an infants school and later a library and offices. In 1994, Sleaford Little Theatre bought and restored it and in 2000 it opened to the public. The Sleaford Picturedrome opened in 1920; the cinema closed in 2000 and the building became a snooker hall and then a nightclub that closed in 2008.

Sleaford Museum Trust was formed in the 1970s to collect and preserve historical artefacts from the town's history. A Heritage Lottery Fund grant of more than £94,000 in December 2013 allowed the trust to establish a museum on Southgate, which opened in April 2015. Sleaford and District Civic Trust was founded in 1972 to "preserve the best features" of the town.

There is a volunteer twinning association, the Sleaford and District Town Twinning Association, which was founded in 1999. The association has created and maintains links and annual visits with Marquette-lez-Lille in France since 1999, and with Fredersdorf-Vogelsdorf in Germany since 2009.

Sport
Sleaford Town F.C. played in the United Counties League Premier Division for the 2014–15 season. Formed as Sleaford Amateurs F.C. in 1920, the club was renamed Sleaford Town in 1968. In 2007 it moved to its present grounds at Eslaforde Park. Sleaford Rugby FC's clubhouse opened in 1999 off the A153. Sleaford Golf Club was founded in 1905 and had roughly 100 members the following year, which increased to 193 in 1911. The original golf course has been altered. In 2014, the club had roughly 600 members. Sleaford Cricket Club has grounds at London Road; the earliest record of the club is in 1803. The town is also home to Bristol Bowls Club, and an all-discipline gymnastics club founded in 1996. An outdoor lido opened in 1872 on riverside land owned by the Bristol estate but handed over to the community as public baths. Indoor facilities were built in the 20th century and the old lido became Sleaford Leisure Centre. In 2011 Kesteven District Council received a grant of £2.85 million, to fund reconstruction of the centre and its gym.

Sleaford Town Runners is a running club based in the town, Affiliated to UK Athletics, Association of Running Clubs, and ClubMark. Training meetings are held twice a week, and runners from the club participate in a wide range of events including weekly parkruns, 10ks, half marathons, marathons and ultra marathons. Sleaford Town Runners organise the popular Rauceby Ripper cross country race every February which is attended by a wide range of club runners from the county and beyond.

Local media
The main radio stations for the county are BBC Radio Lincolnshire, broadcasting on 94.9 FM and 104.7 FM frequencies, and the commercial station Lincs FM, on 102.2, 96.7 and 97.6 FM. The town's local newspapers are the Sleaford Standard (founded in 1924), the Sleaford Advertiser (founded in 1980) and the Sleaford Target (founded in 1984). Historically, the Sleaford Gazette operated between 1854 and 1960; the Sleaford Journal ran from at least 1884 until it was incorporated into the Gazette in December 1929, while the Sleaford Telegraph ran from 1888 to 1889 and the Sleaford Guardian was in print for a year from 1945 to 1946.

Social media 
The residents of Sleaford have various social media sites including Twitter and Facebook. However the main Facebook group for residents is LET'S TALK SLEAFORD on Facebook. This group has over 14,000 members who discuss business, pets, family life, jokes and general complaints or advice. Twitter is home to various profiles for Sleaford including Sleaford Target, Rotary Club of Sleaford and Sleaford Standard. Also, the hashtag #sleaford is used commonly in discussion of the town.

Landmarks

A small number of medieval buildings remain standing in the town. St Denys' Church and St Botolph's in Quarrington date to the 12th and 13th centuries respectively, while Sleaford's half-timbered vicarage is 15th century. St Denys' Church is noted for its tracery and its stone broach spire is one of the oldest in England. Cogglesford Mill is the only remaining watermill in town and is a testament to the economic importance of the River Slea from the late-Saxon period onwards. The Bishops of Lincoln used the medieval town as a base, constructing the now-ruined Sleaford Castle, and as a means of extracting produce and wealth through demesne farming and by granting a market and limited freedoms to the town. As a result, the oldest areas are the market place and the four roads which meet there: Northgate, Southgate, Eastgate and Westgate; many 18th- and 19th-century buildings are found in this area.

Buildings dating from these centuries include William Alvey's baroque house on Northgate, the Manor House on Northgate inset with medieval masonry, and Sessions House on the Market Place. The Carre family founded the grammar school which was rebuilt in 1834, the hospital, rebuilt in 1830, and the almshouses, rebuilt 1857, while the Victorian builders Charles Kirk and Thomas Parry constructed or added to numerous public buildings and private residences, including Lafford Terrace and their own houses on Southgate and at Westholme.

During the Industrial Revolution, the Slea was canalised in 1794 and the Sleaford Navigation Company constructed offices and wharves along Carre Street. The canal brought trade, while the Gothic-fronted gasworks on Eastgate lit the town from 1839. Benjamin Handley and Anthony Peacock financed and benefited from the navigation and founded the bank that took over Alvey's House on Northgate and later added a Baroque extension; Henry Handley, a Member of Parliament, is commemorated by the Handley Memorial on Southgate, a Gothic monument in the style of an Eleanor Cross. During the 1850s, the railways arrived and the station was built in a Gothic style. Sleaford's agricultural location and new transport links encouraged seed trading and malting in the late 19th century: the seed merchant Charles Sharpe's house, The Pines, is on Boston Road. The massive Bass and Company maltings complex, constructed in brick off Mareham Lane between 1892 and 1905, is grade II*listed and has a frontage more than 1,000 feet long.

Sleafordians
The Handley family were well-connected with business; Benjamin Handley was a lawyer, prominent in the Navigation Company and partner in the local bank Peacock, Handley and Kirton. His son, Henry, was M.P. for South Lincolnshire; after his death, the residents erected a monument to him on Southgate. Robert Armstrong Yerburgh the son of Rev. Richard Yerburgh, vicar of New Sleaford, was twice M.P. for Chester. Sir Thomas Meres, politician was educated at the grammar school. Sir Robert Pattinson, also educated at the grammar, was M.P. for Grantham and Sleaford and chairman of Kesteven County Council.

The religious controversialist Henry Pickworth was born in New Sleaford and challenged the opponent of Quakerism Francis Bugg to an open debate at Sleaford. John Austin, a religious writer, was educated at the grammar school. William Scoffin served as the town's Presbyterian minister and preached there for more than forty years, while Benjamin Fawcett, Presbyterian minister, was born and educated at Sleaford. Andrew Kippis, the Presbyterian minister, biographer and Fellow of the Royal Society, attended the Grammar School.

The portrait painter Charles Haslewood Shannon (1863–1937), was born in Sleaford. Richard Banister, the oculist, practised for 14 years in Sleaford, where he trained in couching cataracts. Henry Andrews astronomer and astrologer, worked in Sleaford during his youth.

The royalist poet Thomas Shipman was educated at Carre's Grammar School, as was novelist Henry Jackson; Joseph Smedley, the actor and comedian, built the theatre in 1824, before settling in the town in 1842, establishing a printing business and dying in North Street; and Charles Haslewood Shannon, the artist, was born in the town. The actress and comedian Jennifer Saunders was born in Sleaford. In popular culture, the singer Lois Wilkinson of the Caravelles was born in the town; glamour model Abi Titmuss grew up in Ruskington and was educated at Kesteven and Sleaford High School; and Bernie Taupin, Elton John's lyricist, was born in the town. Eric Thompson who narrated The Magic Roundabout television series, was born in a house on Jermyn Street. In sport, the professional footballer Mark Wallington who played for Leicester City, Derby County and Lincoln City, grew up in Sleaford and, after retiring, taught Physical Education at St George's Academy.

In academia, the botanist David H. N. Spence was born in Sleaford; and the sociologist Sheila Allen attended Kesteven and Sleaford High School.

See also
Sleaford (disambiguation)
Sleaford Mods
Sleaford Town Runners

References

Notes

Citations 

Bibliography

Further reading

 

Pawley, S. (1992). "Democracy and proper drains: public health and landed influence in late-nineteenth-century Sleaford", Lincolnshire Past and Present, no. 7. (Society for Lincolnshire History and Archaeology)
Ranger, William (1850). Report to the General Board of Health on a Preliminary Inquiry into the Sewerage, Drainage, and Supply of Water, and the Sanitary Condition of the Inhabitants of the Parish of New Sleaford, London: Her Majesty's Stationery Office.

External links

Sleaford Town Council

Sleaford Leisure Centre

 
Towns in Lincolnshire
Civil parishes in Lincolnshire
Market towns in Lincolnshire
North Kesteven District